Laurer is a surname. Notable people with the surname include:

George Laurer (1925–2019), American engineer
Johann Friedrich Laurer (1798–1853), German anatomist, pharmacologist, and lichenologist
Scott J. Laurer (born 1965), American judge
Walter Laurer, Austrian para-alpine skier